Drietabbetje Airstrip  serves the Tapanahony River village of Drietabbetje, Suriname. The river breaks into braided channels at Drietabbetje, and the airstrip is on one of the larger islands.

Charter airlines and destinations

See also

List of airports in Suriname
Transport in Suriname

References

External links
FallingRain - Drietabbetje Airstrip
OurAirports - Drietabbetje
OpenStreetMap - Drietabbetje

Google Maps - Drietabbetje

Airports in Suriname
Sipaliwini District